Jacques Lauwerys (born 2 April 1888, date of death unknown) was a Belgian sailor. He competed in the Dragon event at the 1948 Summer Olympics.

References

External links
 

1888 births
Year of death missing
Belgian male sailors (sport)
Olympic sailors of Belgium
Sailors at the 1948 Summer Olympics – Dragon
Sportspeople from Antwerp